Mats Wilander successfully defended his title, by defeating Anders Järryd 7–6, 6–3 in the final.

Seeds

Draw

Finals

Top half

Section 1

Section 2

Bottom half

Section 3

Section 4

References

External links
 Official results archive (ATP)
 Official results archive (ITF)

1984 Grand Prix (tennis)